Swan 601 is a performance cruiser/racer designed by Germán Frers and built by Nautor's Swan. It was created with the intention of being a one design class following on from the successful launch of the Swan 45 and had two successful seasons however it never gained enough momentum. The boats produced have continued to have considerable racing success in general fleets.

External links
 Nautor Swan
 German Frers

References

Keelboats
Sailing yachts
2000s sailboat type designs
Sailboat types built by Nautor Swan
Sailboat type designs by Germán Frers